Ekaterini "Katerina" Koffa (born April 10, 1969) is a retired Greek sprinter who won the 200 metres at the 1997 IAAF World Indoor Championships. Koffa still holds the indoor and outdoor Greek records in 200 metres.

She was born in Karditsa.

Honours

References

1969 births
Living people
Greek female sprinters
Olympic athletes of Greece
Athletes (track and field) at the 1988 Summer Olympics
Athletes (track and field) at the 1996 Summer Olympics
Athletes (track and field) at the 2000 Summer Olympics
Athletes from Karditsa
Mediterranean Games silver medalists for Greece
Mediterranean Games bronze medalists for Greece
Mediterranean Games medalists in athletics
Athletes (track and field) at the 1991 Mediterranean Games
Athletes (track and field) at the 1993 Mediterranean Games
Athletes (track and field) at the 1997 Mediterranean Games
World Athletics Indoor Championships winners
Olympic female sprinters
20th-century Greek women